Research shows that a disproportionate number of homeless youth in the United States identify as lesbian, gay, bisexual or transgender, or LGBT. Researchers suggest that this is primarily a result of hostility or abuse from the young people's families leading to eviction or running away. In addition, LGBT youth are often at greater risk for certain dangers while homeless, including being the victims of crime, risky sexual behavior, substance use disorders, and mental health concerns.

Prevalence

Although specific estimates of the percentage of United States homeless youth who identify as LGBT vary widely, estimates generally fall somewhere between 11 and 40 percent. Barriers to a more definitive percentage include the lack of a nationally representative study and the possibility of underreporting due to stigma associated with identifying as LGBT. The city from which the sample is drawn for each study may also account for a difference in estimates. For example, one 2004 study at the University of Nebraska - Lincoln noted that while estimates based on samples from Los Angeles range from 25 to 40 percent, a 1999 study of small and medium Midwestern cities concluded that only 6% of homeless youth there identified as LGBT. According to the authors of this study, geographical location could affect these numbers. For example, due to the higher risk of coming out in rural, midwestern cities, youth may be more likely to either stay closeted there or to migrate to larger cities. Further, the authors continue, the differences might reflect differences in the ages of the samples in the different studies or other differences in sampling methodology. The study concludes that when taken together, a consensus can be found among the studies that 20% of homeless youth in magnet cities identify as gay, lesbian or bisexual, with the number being slightly lower in nonmagnet cities. Finally, in a 2012 study, legal expert Nusrat Ventimiglia noted that studies focusing on the number of transgender youth who experience homelessness are less prevalent, and therefore including youth who identify as transgender but not as gay, lesbian or bisexual could result in an estimate of 40 percent.

Explanations for overrepresentation
Researchers have posed a few core explanations for the overrepresentation of LGBT youth in the general United States homeless youth population. LGBT youth are more likely to be homeless because they run away or are evicted due to family conflict surrounding their sexual orientation or behavior. This explanation is supported by a 2011 survey study of a representative Massachusetts high school sample that found that LGBT youth were no more likely to be homeless and living with their parents than non-LGBT youth. Therefore, according to the study's authors, it may not be that LGBT youth are more likely to be part of a homeless family, but rather that their higher rate of homelessness is caused by being more likely to be evicted or run away. A 2008 study using in-person interviews found that among youth who experienced homelessness for more than six months, lesbian, gay, and bisexual youth were more likely than heterosexual youth to report being verbally or physically harassed by family. In addition, LGBT youth are more likely to be homeless due to physical or sexual abuse experienced at home.  The Hetrick-Martin Institute showed that among homeless queer girls aged 13–15 in New York City, that 50% of them were homeless because they were fleeing familial corrective rape.  In the background of both these explanations is the fact that, since the family conflicts associated with LGBT youth occur relatively late in a youth's development, LGBT youth are much less likely to be placed in foster care. Those who are placed in a foster home find an unwelcoming or hostile environment, and a study on the New York City Child Welfare System reported 78% of LGBTQ youth were kicked out or ran away from their foster home as a result. Finally, many other factors that lead to increased risk of homelessness in adolescents disproportionately affect LGBT youth, such as experiencing conflict at school.

Comparison to heterosexual counterparts
A large body of research details the differences in experiences between LGBT homeless youth and their heterosexual counterparts.

Victimization
Homeless youth in the United States who identify as LGBT are more likely to be victims of crime than heterosexual homeless youth. For example, a 2002 study using structured interviews of homeless youth in the Seattle area found that male LGBT youth were more often sexually victimized while homeless than non-LGBT male youth. A 2004 study using interviews of homeless youth in eight midwestern cities determined that lesbian adolescents experiencing homelessness were more likely to report physical victimization than their heterosexual female counterparts.

Sexual behavior and health
LGBT homeless youth are more likely to engage in survival sex or prostitution as a last resort to meet basic needs. In particular, in a 2012 study, legal expert Nusrat Ventimiglia noted that participation in the sex industry, homelessness, and lack of social support are particularly high among transgender women. A 2008 study that used interviews of homeless youth who use substances in the Southwestern United States determined a significant correlation between survival sex and HIV risk. Finally, a Seattle area 2002 study found that LGBT youth reported more lifetime sexual partners than their heterosexual counterparts, with double the number of LGBT youth reporting not using protection during sex 'all of the time.'

Substance use
Some research shows that LGBT homeless youth may be more likely to recreationally use substances than their heterosexual counterparts. For example, a 2002 study using structured interviews of homeless youth in the Seattle area found that in the past six months, sexual minority youth had used each tested substance (including marijuana, cocaine/crack, acid, ecstasy, and several others) more frequently than heterosexual youth. That being said, a 2008 study that used interviews of homeless youth who used substances in the Southwestern United States found no significant difference in drug use between heterosexual and gay, lesbian, and transgender youth within its sample.

Mental health
Homeless youth who identify as LGBT are more likely than non-LGBT homeless youth to experience clinical depression or depressive symptoms as well as other mental health problems. A  2006 study using survey data of homeless lesbian, gay, and bisexual youth in eight cities found that 62 percent of lesbian, gay and bisexual homeless youth had attempted suicide, compared to 29 percent of non-lesbian, gay or bisexual youth. LGBT youth are 8.4 more times likely to attempt suicide if they are rejected by their family as a teen than if they are not rejected. In particular, a 2004 study based on interviews of homeless youth in the urban Midwest indicated that lesbian youth were more like than heterosexual females to show signs of post-traumatic stress disorder, suicidal ideation and attempts, and among gay, lesbian and heterosexual youth, lesbian adolescents were more likely to report caretaker and street victimization as well as mental health problems.

Emergency housing access
LGBT homeless youth experience limited access to emergency housing options that affirm their sexual orientation and/or gender identity, and according to a Note for the Family Court Review recommending policies regarding such housing options, as many as fifty percent of LGBT youth in emergency housing programs may be physically assaulted, a proportion further exacerbated at large shelters that house two hundred or more youth. In addition, a homeless youth emergency housing program's religious affiliation may lead to the denial of services to LGBT youth or the sending of youth to sexual orientation conversion therapy.

Response

Federal policy
The government spends $4.2 billion annually on homeless assistance programs, but less than 5% of this funding ($195 million) is allocated for homeless children and youth, and a fraction of that in turn for unaccompanied homeless youth. Furthermore, the United States Interagency Council on Homelessness has acknowledged that LGBT youth are at a 120% greater risk of homelessness than heterosexual youth, and that they are also more vulnerable to negative health conditions, exploitation, and human trafficking. There are currently no federal programs or policies designed to specifically meet the needs of or protect LGBT homeless youth in the United States.

There are concerns about discrimination against directing funding toward homeless LGBT youth. Federal funds are allocated to organizations that provide shelter and services to homeless youth in the United States through two major programs: The Runaway and Homeless Youth Act (RHYA), first implemented in 1974 as the Runaway Youth Act and reauthorized multiple times since then, and the McKinney-Vento Homeless Assistance Act. According to the Center for American Progress, there are no mandates that the federal funds from these programs be provided to shelters that do not discriminate against LGBT youth. This means that some funding is given to organizations with explicitly anti-gay or anti-transgender policies. This can lead to denial of care, youth being afraid to access services, or youth being sent to sexual orientation conversion therapy.

Experts argue that policymakers are complacent regarding the specific problem of homeless LGBT youth. Runaway Youth Act programs are severely underfunded and are only able to provide services to a small portion of youth experiencing homelessness; and yet the Office of Management and Budget's 2006 rates these programs as 'effective', which is the highest rating possible. Federal responses remain focused on addressing gaps in research and data, such as questions determining factors of entry and exit to homelessness, impacts of homelessness on life outcomes, and effective ways to specify services and housing for homeless youth. As there are a disproportionate number of LGBT homeless youth, there needs to be an equivalent focus from researchers on addressing questions and issues specific to LGBT homeless youth. Chaplin Hall and the Voices of Youth Count conducted relevant research in 2018 and formulated recommendations and solutions to gaps in research for policymakers to utilize.

Advocacy
Many individuals and organizations, including the  Center for American Progress and the National Gay and Lesbian Task Force, advocate for change to institutional policies regarding homelessness among LGBT youth in the United States. The goals and visions of these activists include:
Federally mandating that organizations receiving federal funding do not discriminate against LGBT youth
Mandating LGBT-specific training for homeless youth service providers
Establishing anti-discrimination policies among all relevant federal agencies for LGBT youth
Creating a federal "healthy families" program that provides counseling to families with LGBT children
Working to eliminate bullying of LGBT students in schools
Increasing federal research on this issue
The establishing of shelters and programs specifically serving LGBT homeless youth
In shelters and programs for homeless youth, using intake forms that allow but do not require youths to identify their sexual orientation and gender identity, as well as ensuring the forms do not make assumptions about the youth's sexual orientation or gender identity.
Placing occupancy caps on homeless shelters to reduce violence
Ensuring that LGBT youth are not placed with another youth that is overtly hostile or demeaning of LGBT individuals.
Establishing private shower facilities in shelters
Segregating genders in a shelter by self-identified gender, rather than genitalia
For those shelters requiring dress codes, making such codes gender-neutral

Non-profits
There are less than a dozen nonprofit organizations in the nation that focus on providing LGBT homeless youth specialized services, and most of them are on the coasts. In a 2012 web-based survey of homeless youth organizations, 94% of respondents reported serving LGBT homeless youth within the past year. Funding was the most common factor cited as an obstacle to combating homelessness among LGBT youth. Prominent shelters specifically for LGBT homeless youth include the Ali Forney Center, named after an African-American transgender teenager who experienced homelessness and was murdered in 1997, and the Ruth Ellis Center.

See also
 Violence against LGBT people in the United States
 LGBT history in the United States
 Family estrangement
 Homelessness in the United States
 Social exclusion

Notes

References

 Christiani, A., Hudson, A. L., Nyamathi, A., Mutere, M., & Sweat, J. (2008). Attitudes of Homeless and Drug-Using Youth Regarding Barriers and Facilitators in Delivery of Quality and Culturally Sensitive Health Care. Journal of Child & Adolescent Psychiatric Nursing, 21(3), 154–163. doi:10.1111/j.1744-6171.2008.00139.x
 Cochran, B. N., Stewart, A. J., Ginzler, J. A., & Cauce, A. (2002). Challenges Faced by Homeless Sexual Minorities: Comparison of Gay, Lesbian, Bisexual, and Transgender Homeless Adolescents With Their Heterosexual Counterparts. American Journal of  Public Health, 92(5), 773–777.
 Corliss, H. L., Goodenow, C. S., Nichols, L., & Austin, S. (2011). High Burden of Homelessness Among Sexual-Minority Adolescents: Findings From a Representative Massachusetts High School Sample. American Journal of Public Health, 101(9), 1683–1689. doi:10.2105/AJPH.2011.300155
 Durso, L. E., & Gates, G. J. (2012). Serving Our Youth: Findings from a National Survey of Services Providers Working with Lesbian, Gay, Bisexual and Transgender Youth Who Are Homeless or At Risk of Becoming Homeless. The Williams Institute.
 Gangamma, R., Slesnick, N., Toviessi, P., & Serovich, J. (2008). Comparison of HIV Risks among Gay, Lesbian, Bisexual, and Heterosexual Homeless Youth. Journal of Youth & Adolescence, 37(4), 456–464. doi:10.1007/s10964-007-9171-9
 Hunter, E. (2008). What's Good for the Gays is Good for the Gander: Making Homeless Youth Housing Safer for Lesbian, Gay, Bisexual, and Transgender Youth.  Family Court Review, 46(3), 543–557. doi:10.1111/j.1744-1617.2008.00220.x
 Mottet, L., & Ohle, J. M. (2003). Transitioning Our Shelters: A Guide to Making Homeless Shelters Safe for Transgender People. National Gay and Lesbian Task Force.
Quintana, N. S., Rosenthal, J., & Krehley, J. (2010). On the Streets. Center for American Progress. 
 Ray, Nicholas, and Colby Berger. Lesbian, gay, bisexual and transgender youth: An epidemic of homelessness. National Gay and Lesbian Task Force Policy Institute, 2007.
 Rew, L., Whittaker, T. A., Taylor-Seehafer, M. A., & Smith, L. R. (2005). Sexual Health Risks and Protective Resources in Gay, Lesbian, Bisexual, and Heterosexual Homeless Youth. Journal For Specialists In Pediatric Nursing, 10(1), 11–19.
Van Leeuwen, J. M., Boyle, S., Salomonsen-Sautel, S., Baker, D. N., Garcia, J. T., Hoffman, A., & Hopfer, C. J. (2006). Lesbian, Gay, and Bisexual Homeless Youth: An Eight-City Public Health Perspective. Child Welfare, 85(2), 151–170.
 Ventimiglia, N. (2012). “LGBT Selective Victimization: Unprotected Youth on the Streets.” Journal of Law in Society, 13(2): 439–453.
 Whitbeck, Les B.; Chen, Xiaojin; Hoyt, Dan R.; Tyler, Kimberly; and Johnson, Kurt D., "Mental Disorder, Subsistence Strategies, and Victimization among Gay, Lesbian, and Bisexual Homeless and Runaway Adolescents" (2004). Sociology Department, Faculty Publications. Paper 53.

LGBT youth
Homelessness in the United States
LGBT and homelessness
Persecution of LGBT people
LGBT in the United States
Youth in the United States